Gredler is an Austrian surname. Notable people with the surname include:

 Ludwig Gredler (born 1967), Austrian biathlete
 Vinzenz Maria Gredler (1823–1912), Austrian naturalist

Surnames of Austrian origin